Jet Storm (also known as Jet Stream or Killing Urge) is a 1959 British thriller film directed and co-written by Cy Endfield. Richard Attenborough stars with Stanley Baker, Hermione Baddeley and Diane Cilento. The film is a precursor to the later aviation disaster film genre such as Airport (1970).

Plot
Ernest Tilley (Richard Attenborough), a former scientist who lost his daughter two years earlier in a hit-and-run accident, tracks down James Brock (George Rose), the man he believes is responsible for the accident and boards the same airliner on a transatlantic flight, flying from London to New York.

Tilley has hidden a bomb on board and threatens to blow it up in an act of vengeance, not only killing Brock but also all passengers and crew.

When Captain Bardow (Stanley Baker) and the passengers realise that he is serious, and they cannot find the bomb (which Tilley had attached to the underside of the airliner's left wing), they begin to panic. Some want to pressure him into revealing the location of the bomb, while others such as Doctor Bergstein (David Kossoff) try to reason with the now silent Tilley. Mulliner (Patrick Allen), a terrified passenger, attempts to kill Brock to stop Tilley from setting off the bomb.

Acting out of fear, Brock is killed when he smashes a window and is blown out of the airliner. Tilley comes to his senses when a young boy passenger, Jeremy Tracer (Jeremy Judge), soothes him. He then disconnects the remote control for the bomb, and commits suicide by poison. As the airliner approaches New York, the passengers realise that they will survive.

Cast

 Richard Attenborough as Ernest Tilley
 Stanley Baker as Capt. Bardow
 Hermione Baddeley as Mrs Satterly
 Bernard Braden as Otis Randolf
 Barbara Kelly as Edwina Randolf
 Diane Cilento as Angelica Como
 David Kossoff as Dr Bergstein
 Virginia Maskell as Pam Leyton
 Harry Secombe as Binky Meadows
 Elizabeth Sellars as Inez Barrington
 Dame Sybil Thorndike as Emma Morgan
 Mai Zetterling as Carol Tilley
 Marty Wilde as Billy Forrester
 Patrick Allen as Mulliner
 Paul Carpenter as George Towers
 Megs Jenkins as Rose Brock
 Jocelyn Lane as Clara Forrester
 Cec Linder as Col Coe
 Neil McCallum as Gil Gilbert
 Lana Morris as Jane Tracer
 George Rose as James Brock
 Peter Bayliss as Bentley
 Captain John Crewdson as Whitman
 Paul Eddington as Victor Tracer
 Glyn Houston as Michaels
 Peter Illing as Gelderen
 Jeremy Judge as Jeremy Tracer
 George Murcell as Saunders 
 Alun Owen as Green
 Irene Prador as Sophia Gelderen

Production
The type of aircraft depicted is a Soviet-built Tupolev Tu-104. Although the airline and its crew are clearly British, having departed from London and a BEA Vickers Viscount is also seen, the aircraft shown at the beginning is sporting the Soviet Union's flag on the tail. This twin-jet airliner was only used by airlines in the Soviet bloc. A medium-range airliner, the Tu-104 also could not have been used on transatlantic routes.

Reception
In the Time Out review, John Pym saw Jet Storm as, "A British prototype for the Airport disaster movies of the '60s and '70s." He went on to note, "... like its later supersonic counterparts, Endfield's film is naive and contrived, but not without interest as the alarmed passengers soon divide into groups: reactionary (advocating torture) and liberal (patience and persuasion)."

The TV Guide critic wrote, "... thanks to an outstanding cast, this air-disaster film manages to limp to a landing with its 'thriller' status intact." The Radio Times applauded "... a star turn for Attenborough, who brings a convincing complexity to the role of bomber and bereft father."

References
Notes

Citations

'Bibliography

 Pym, John, ed. "Jet Storm." Time Out Film Guide''. London: Time Out Guides Limited, 2004. .

External links
 

1950s thriller films
British aviation films
British films about revenge
British thriller films
Films directed by Cy Endfield
Films set on airplanes
1950s English-language films
1950s British films